Pforzheim Chamber Orchestra (full German name: Südwestdeutsches Kammerorchester Pforzheim; full English name: South-west German Chamber Orchestra Pforzheim) is an internationally known German chamber orchestra based in Pforzheim.

History 
The orchestra was founded in 1950 by Friedrich Tilegant, a student of Paul Hindemith. It was directed by Paul Angerer from 1971 to 1981, by Vladislav Czarnecki since 1986, and by Sebastian Tewinkel from 2002 to 2012. Since 2013, Timo Handschuh has served as the orchestra's chief conductor and artistic director.

In 1970 the orchestra conducted a composition competition for its twentieth anniversary; the first prize was awarded to Ulrich Stranz.

Repertoire and recordings
The orchestra has recorded numerous works of Johann Sebastian Bach with the Heinrich-Schütz-Chor Heilbronn and conductor Fritz Werner, including several cantatas, the Mass in B minor (in 1957), the St Matthew Passion (1958), the St John Passion (1960), the Christmas Oratorio (1963), and the Easter Oratorio (1964). 

It has been instrumental in premieres of works by Boris Blacher, Jean Françaix, Harald Genzmer, and Enjott Schneider.

The orchestra has also recorded the twelve cello concertos of Luigi Boccherini with cellist Julius Berger, a professor at the University of Mainz. A review stated: "Berger is ably assisted in this concerto with sensitive and polished accompaniments from the Southwest German Chamber Orchestra using modern instruments under Maestro Vladislav Czarnecki."

References

External links 
 
 South West German Chamber Orchestra, Pforzheim on the Naxos website
 Südwestdeutsches Kammerorchester Pforzheim on the website of the Eckelshausener Musiktage (in German)
 Entries for recordings of the Pforzheim Chamber Orchestra on WorldCat

German orchestras
Chamber orchestras
1950 establishments in West Germany
Arts organizations established in 1950
Chamber Orchestra